ARA Patagonia (B-1) is a multi-product replenishment oiler of the  in service in the Argentine Navy. She was the lead ship of her class serving in the French Navy as Durance (A 629) from 1977 to 1999. In French service, the ship served with the Force d'action navale (FAR, "Naval Action Force"). In Argentine service the vessel is used in multi-national naval exercises and supplies the Antarctic missions operating from Ushuaia. In 2017, Patagonia was used to search for the missing submarine .

Description
Durance as constructed, carried two cranes abaft the bridge.

Durance was equipped with two landing craft for vehicles and personnel. The ship has two dual solid/liquid underway transfer stations per side and can replenish two ships per side and one astern.

The Durance-class tankers all mount a flight deck over the stern and a hangar. The ship utilised Aérospatiale Alouette III and Westland Lynx helicopters in French service, but are capable of operating larger ones from their flight deck. For defence, Durance was armed with twin-mounted Bofors /L60 anti-aircraft (AA) guns and four  machine guns. The ship is equipped with two Racal Decca 1226 radars. In Argentine service, Patagonia has a complement of 164 including 10 officers with accommodation for 29 more.

Construction and career

French service
Durance was the first ship ordered in its class, and was constructed by the Arsenal de Brest at Brest, France, with its keel laid down on 10 December 1973. The ship was launched on 6 September 1975. The vessel entered service on 1 December 1976. In French service, the ship was assigned to the Force d'action navale (FAR, "Naval Action Force"). Durance was decommissioned on 5 December 1997 and placed in reserve. The ship was sold to the Argentine Navy on 12 July 1999.

Argentine service

Renamed ARA Patagonia, the replenishment ship arrived at Puerto Belgrano on 29 August 1999 where she spent one year in drydock receiving an overhaul of her engines and hull. She was commissioned with the pennant number B-1 (LGPA) into the Amphibious and Logistic Naval Command (COAL) of the fleet on 9 July 2000 and made her first voyage in the following month. Since then Patagonia has participated in numerous exercises and operations within the fleet and foreign navies including Pre-Unitas, UNITAS, Gringo-Gaucho, Atlasur, PASSEX, Ghost, and Fraterno with the United States, Chile, Brazil and Spain among others. The ship is annually deployed south during the Antarctic summer campaigns to supply  and  operating from Ushuaia.

In May 2005 about 30 congressmen from Argentina and Chile celebrated the 20 anniversary of the Peace and Friendship Treaty aboard Patagonia. In 2010 she served as support/control unit for the tall ships regatta that took part of the Argentina Bicentennial celebrations. In November 2017, Patagonia was used in the search for the missing Argentine submarine . The ship was reported non-operational in 2020. However, as of 2022 it was designated to participate in UNITAS 2022 exercises in Brazil. In October 2022, it was reported that the Argentine defence ministry had allocated funding for a refit of the ship to be carried out at the Puerto Belgrano Naval Arsenal in collaboration with the Tandanor shipyard. The ship was reported to have entered dry dock in early 2023.

References

Notes

Citations
Portions taken from Spanish Wikipedia

Bibliography

Further reading
 Guia de los buques de la Armada Argentina 2005–2006. Ignacio Amendolara Bourdette, Editor n/a. (Spanish/English text)

External links

 Official site 

Durance-class tankers of the Argentine Navy
Ships built in France
1975 ships
Auxiliary ships of Argentina